Multidendrolaelaps is a genus of mites in the family Digamasellidae. There are at least 30 described species in Multidendrolaelaps.

Species
These 30 species belong to the genus Multidendrolaelaps:

 Multidendrolaelaps acriluteus (Athias-Henriot, 1961)
 Multidendrolaelaps baddeley (Hirschmann & Wisniewski, 1984)
 Multidendrolaelaps bakeri (Hirschmann & Wisniewski, 1982)
 Multidendrolaelaps bispinosus (Karg, 1971)
 Multidendrolaelaps camerunis (Wisniewski & Hirschmann, 1984)
 Multidendrolaelaps carinthiacus Schmölzer, 1995
 Multidendrolaelaps daelei (Hirschmann & Wisniewski, 1982)
 Multidendrolaelaps epistospinosus Shcherbak, 1985
 Multidendrolaelaps euepistomoides (Hirschmann & Wisniewski, 1982)
 Multidendrolaelaps euepistomosimilis (Hirschmann & Wisniewski, 1982)
 Multidendrolaelaps euepistomus (Hirschmann, 1960)
 Multidendrolaelaps hexaspinosus (Hirschmann, 1954)
 Multidendrolaelaps hurlbutti Shcherbak, 1985
 Multidendrolaelaps inconstans Shcherbak, 1985
 Multidendrolaelaps isodentatus (Hurlbutt, 1967)
 Multidendrolaelaps kargi (Hirschmann, 1966)
 Multidendrolaelaps kribii (Wisniewski & Hirschmann, 1984)
 Multidendrolaelaps manualkrantzi (Hirschmann & Wisniewski, 1982)
 Multidendrolaelaps multidentatus (Leitner, 1949)
 Multidendrolaelaps putte Huhta & Karg, 2010
 Multidendrolaelaps querci (Hirschmann, 1960)
 Multidendrolaelaps schusteri (Hirschmann, 1966)
 Multidendrolaelaps spinosus (Hirschmann, 1960)
 Multidendrolaelaps subcorticalis Huhta & Karg, 2010
 Multidendrolaelaps templei (Hunter, 1970)
 Multidendrolaelaps tetraspinosus (Hirschmann, 1954)
 Multidendrolaelaps trispinosus Shcherbak, 1985
 Multidendrolaelaps ulmi (Hirschmann, 1960)
 Multidendrolaelaps unispinatus (Ishikawa, 1977)
 Multidendrolaelaps watsoni (Hirschmann, 1966)

References

Digamasellidae
Articles created by Qbugbot